Snarki  is a village in the administrative district of Gmina Gielniów, within Przysucha County, Masovian Voivodeship, in east-central Poland.

The village has a population of 330.

References

External links
 Gmina Gielniów website

Snarki